Ibrahim Wasif (November 4, 1908 – May 17, 1975) was a Light-Heavyweight (75–82.5 kg) in the Egyptian weightlifting team at the Summer Olympics of 1936 in Berlin. He earned a bronze medal for Egypt after lifting a record of 360 kg. This contributed to Egypt's total of 5 medals won during the 1936 games.

See also
 List of Egyptians

References

External links
Ibrahim Wasif's profile at Sports Reference.com

1908 births
1975 deaths
Egyptian male weightlifters
Olympic weightlifters of Egypt
Weightlifters at the 1936 Summer Olympics
Weightlifters at the 1948 Summer Olympics
Olympic bronze medalists for Egypt
Olympic medalists in weightlifting
Medalists at the 1936 Summer Olympics
20th-century Egyptian people